Uri Rubin (1944 – 26 October 2021) was an Israeli academic who was a professor in the Department of Arabic and Islamic Studies at Tel Aviv University. His areas of research were early Islam (with special emphasis on the Qur'an), Qur'an exegesis (tafsir), and early Islamic tradition (sira and hadith). He authored a number of books on the subjects, and also contributed entries to the Encyclopaedia of Islam and other works.

Rubin also served on the Advisory Board for the Encyclopaedia of the Qur'an.

Books
 The Eye of the Beholder: The Life of Muhammad as Viewed by the Early Muslims (A Textual Analysis). Princeton, New Jersey: The Darwin Press, 1995.
 Between Bible and Qur'an: The Children of Israel and the Islamic Self-Image. Princeton, New Jersey: The Darwin Press, 1999.
 Muhammad the Prophet and Arabia. Variorum Collected Studies Series, Ashgate, 2011.

References

1944 births
2021 deaths
Scholars of medieval Islamic history
Academic staff of Tel Aviv University